This is a list of Category A listed buildings in Scotland, which are among the listed buildings of the United Kingdom.

For a fuller list, see the pages linked on List of listed buildings in Scotland.

Key

The organization of the lists in this series is on the same basis as the statutory register. County names are those used in the register, and in the case of Scotland they parallel the current administrative areas.

Category A listed buildings in Scotland

See also
List of castles in Scotland
List of country houses in the United Kingdom
List of hillforts in Scotland
List of historic sites in Scotland
List of monastic houses in Scotland
List of National Trust for Scotland properties
List of post-war Category A listed buildings in Scotland
Listed buildings in England
Listed buildings in Northern Ireland
Listed buildings in Wales
Lists of listed buildings in Scotland
Signal boxes that are listed buildings in Scotland

Notes

External links
Official site
Listed buildings by county in Scotland at britishlistedbuildings.co.uk

 
 

Lists of listed buildings in Scotland